The discography of the Japanese rock band One Ok Rock consists of ten studio albums, two EPs, and thirty-one singles. One Ok Rock was formed in Tokyo, Japan in 2005, currently consists of Takahiro Moriuchi (vocals), Toru Yamashita (guitar/leader), Ryota Kohama (bass), and Tomoya Kanki (drums). One Ok Rock have sold more than 3 million records worldwide.

Their 2012 single "The Beginning" is the most popular song by the band, having reached more than 190 million views on their YouTube channel, further skyrocketing One Ok Rock's popularity. The song was chosen as the theme song for the live action movie adaptation of Rurouni Kenshin. It peaked at #2 on the Billboard Japan Hot 100 and stayed for 45 weeks and also charted at #5 on the Oricon charts. Later in 2013, "The Beginning" won "Best Rock Video" and "Best Video from a Film" from the MTV Video Music Awards Japan 2013 and "Best Your Choice" in Space Shower Music Video Awards.

Their seventh studio album, 35xxxv, became their first album which charted on US Billboard. It peaked at #11 on Billboard Heatseekers Albums. This chart is for new and upcoming musicians, which is usually a stepping stone towards Billboard 200 or Billboard Hot 100. On the same week, it charted at #43 on Billboard Independent Albums. Then it peaked at #23 on the Billboard Hard Rock Albums Chart and reached #1 on the Billboard World Albums Chart.

In 2017, their eighth album, Ambitions, debuted at #106 on the US Billboard 200. It became One Ok Rock's first studio album to debut at the Billboard 200. It also charted at #2 on the Billboard Top Hard Rock Albums, peaked at #9 on the Billboard Top Alternative Albums and reached #12 on the Billboard Top Rock Albums.

Studio albums

Extended plays

Singles

Other charted songs

Soundtrack songs

Other appearances

Covers

See also
 One Ok Rock videography

Notes

References

External links 
 
 One Ok Rock at AllMusic

Discography
Rock music group discographies
Discographies of Japanese artists